"You Win Again" is a 1952 song by Hank Williams. In style, the song is a blues ballad and deals with the singer's despair with his partner.  The song has been widely covered, including versions by Ray Charles, Jerry Lee Lewis, Roy Orbison, the Grateful Dead, Charley Pride, Bob Dylan, and the Rolling Stones.

Background
Hank Williams recorded "You Win Again" on July 11, 1952—one day after his divorce from Audrey Williams was finalized.  Like "Cold, Cold Heart," the song was likely inspired by his tumultuous relationship with his ex-wife, as biographer Colin Escott observes:

It might have been no more than coincidence, but, in the absence of hard evidence to the contrary, the songs cut that day after Hank's divorce seem like pages torn from his diary...Its theme of betrayal had grown old years before Hank tackled it, but, drawing from his bottomless well of resentment, he gave it a freshness bordering on topicality.

In Williams' original draft, the song had been titled "I Lose Again" but was reversed at producer Fred Rose's insistence.  The song's memorable opening line, "The news is out all over town," begins the story of an utterly defeated narrator who cannot bring himself to leave his love despite her infidelities.  It was recorded at Castle Studio in Nashville with Jerry Rivers (fiddle), Don Helms (steel guitar), and Harold Bradley (rhythm guitar), while it is speculated that Chet Atkins played lead guitar and Ernie Newton played bass.

"You Win Again" was released as the B-side to "Settin' the Woods on Fire", primarily because up-tempo, danceable numbers were preferable as A-sides for radio play and for the valuable jukebox trade.  Nonetheless, "You Win Again" peaked at number ten on the Most Played in C&W Juke Boxes chart, where it remained for a single week.

Cover versions
 Pop singer Tommy Edwards released the song for MGM on the same day as Williams and it rose to #13 on the pop charts in the fall of 1952.
 Williams' friend and rival Lefty Frizzell covered the song for Columbia.
 Late in 1957, Jerry Lee Lewis released the song as the B-side to  "Great Balls of Fire".  His version of the song peaked at number four on the country chart.
 Johnny Cash recorded this song May 13, 1958 for Sun Studio.
 On October 25, 1958, Gene Vincent recorded this song on his album Live At Town Hall Party.
 In 1959, Conway Twitty covered the song on his album Saturday Night with Conway Twitty, side 2.
 Jeanne Black released a version of the song on her 1960 debut album A Little Bit Lonely.
 In 1960, Mark Dinning covered the song on his Teen Angel album. It was also released as the B-side to his "A Star Is Born (A Love Has Died)" single that same year.
 The song appears on the 1962 Ray Charles album Modern Sounds in Country and Western Music.
 George Jones recorded it for his 1962 album My Favorites of Hank Williams.
 Wanda Jackson recorded the song in 1966 on Capitol Records.
 In 1967, Bob Dylan and The Band recorded the song and released it in 2014 on their album The Bootleg Series Vol. 11: The Basement Tapes Complete.
 Stonewall Jackson included the song on his 1969 LP A Tribute to Hank Williams.
 Gram Parsons with members of the Flying Burrito Brothers performed this song at the Avalon Ballroom in San Francisco in 1969 (the footage is available on YouTube).
 During filming for their movie "Let It Be" in 1969, The Beatles played this song, sung by John Lennon.
 In the early 1970s, Mason Proffit recorded a slow, country rock version of the song on their album Rockfish Crossing.
 Roy Orbison recorded it for his Hank Williams tribute LP in 1970.
 The Grateful Dead played the song numerous times on tour during 1971 and 1972.  A live version recorded May 24, 1972 at Lyceum Theatre, London appears on the album Europe '72.Tracy Nelson recorded it on the 1969 album "Mother Earth Presents Tracy Nelson Country"
 Glen Campbell recorded it for his 1973 album I Remember Hank Williams.
 In 1978, Del McCoury recorded the song with his Dixie Pals for the album Our Kind of Grass.
 In 1980, Charley Pride had his twenty-fourth number one country hit with his version.
 Moe Bandy recorded the song for his 1983 tribute Sings the Songs of Hank Williams.
 Townes Van Zandt performs the song on the album Road Songs.
 Mike Ness released this song on his album Cheating at Solitaire in 1999 on Time Bomb Recordings. He has played this song numerous times with Social Distortion.
 Keith Richards covered this song for the Timeless: Hank Williams Tribute album, which won the 2001 Grammy Award for Best Country Album.  The song was also included as a bonus track on the reissue of the Rolling Stones' 1978 album Some Girls, featuring Mick Jagger on vocals.
 In 2005, Martina McBride covered the song for her album Timeless.
 John Scofield included the song in his 2022 solo album.
Tracy Nelson covered the song on the 1969 album "Mother Earth Presents Tracy Nelson Country"

Citations

General and cited sources 
 

1952 songs
1980 singles
Charley Pride songs
Grateful Dead songs
Hank Williams songs
Jerry Lee Lewis songs
Mark Dinning songs
Martina McBride songs
MGM Records singles
RCA Records singles
Song recordings produced by Fred Rose (songwriter)
Songs written by Hank Williams